Aldo Masciotta (14 August 1909 – 24 April 1996) was an Italian fencer. He won a silver medal in the team sabre event at the 1936 Summer Olympics.

References

External links
 
 

1909 births
1996 deaths
Italian male fencers
Olympic fencers of Italy
Fencers at the 1936 Summer Olympics
Olympic silver medalists for Italy
People from Campobasso
Olympic medalists in fencing
Medalists at the 1936 Summer Olympics
Sportspeople from the Province of Campobasso